The Pickersgill Islands are a small archipelago to the west of the main island of South Georgia.

History of Name
Annenkov Island was discovered in January 1775 by a British expedition under Cook, who named it "Pickersgill's Island" after  Lieutenant Richard Pickersgill of the expedition ship HMS Resolution. It was re-discovered in 1819 by a Russian expedition under Bellingshausen, who, thinking he was the discoverer of the island, named it Annenkov Island for Lieutenant Mikhail Annenkov, officer on the expedition ship.

The Pickersgill Islands, meanwhile were discovered in 1819 by a Russian expedition under Bellingshausen, who charted the largest feature of the group as Pickersgill Island, erroneously thinking it to be the island sighted in 1775 by Captain James Cook and named after  Lieutenant Richard Pickersgill of the expedition ship Resolution.

The name "Pickersgill" got transferred from Annenkov Island, to this archipelago  to its southeast. The name Pickersgill Islands has been established by usage for this group of islands; the island originally named by Cook has been known as Annenkov Island since 1819.

See also 
 List of sub-Antarctic islands
 List of Antarctic islands north of 60° S

References

External links 

Islands of South Georgia
Uninhabited islands of South Georgia and the South Sandwich Islands